Mkhululi Calana (born 19 January 1993) is a South African first-class cricketer. He was included in the Border squad for the 2016 Africa T20 Cup.

References

External links
 

1993 births
Living people
South African cricketers
Border cricketers
Cricketers from Cape Town